David John Starkey (born 20 September 1954) is a specialist in eighteenth- and nineteenth-century British maritime history. His research focuses on shipping, seafaring, privateering, fisheries and marine environmental history.

Life
Starkey earned a degree in Economic History from the University of Leeds, and an MA in the History of the Atlantic Economy from the University of Exeter. He has been based since 1994 at the University of Hull, where he was founding director of the Maritime Historical Studies Centre.  He was head of the Department of History from 2011 and 2016, and subsequently Academic Manager for the Faculty of Arts, Cultures and Education.  He retired at Christmas 2019, and continues as Emeritus Professor.

Starkey is co-president of the North Atlantic Fisheries History Association (NAFHA), and chairman of the British Commission for Maritime History.  In 2013 he became Editor-in-Chief of the International Journal of Maritime History.

Publications
 Starkey, David J.: British Privateering Enterprise in the Eighteenth Century. Exeter, University of Exeter Press, 1990, 344pp, .
 Starkey, David J., and E.S. van Eyck van Heslinga. Pirates and Privateers: New Perspectives on the War on Trade in the Eighteenth and Nineteenth Centuries. Exeter: University of Exeter Press, 1997.
 Starkey, David J. Shipping Movements in the Ports of the United Kingdom, 1871–1913: A Statistical Profile. Exeter: University of Exeter Press, 1999.
 David J. Starkey, Jon Th. Thor, Ingo Heidbrink (Eds.): A History of the North Atlantic Fisheries: Vol. 1, From Early Times to the mid-Nineteenth Century. Hauschild u. Deutsches Schiffahrtsmuseum. Bremen 2009

References

External links
Maritime Historical Studies Centre, University of Hull

British maritime historians
Academics of the University of Hull
Living people
1954 births
Alumni of the University of Leeds
Alumni of the University of Exeter